Rodgers Kiprop (born 17 October 1992) is a Kenyan Paralympic athlete. He made his maiden Paralympic appearance during the 2020 Summer Paralympics.

Career 

He represented Kenya at the 2020 Summer Paralympics and competed in men's 5000m T11 event.

References 

1992 births
Living people
Kenyan male long-distance runners
Visually impaired category Paralympic competitors
Athletes (track and field) at the 2020 Summer Paralympics
Paralympic athletes of Kenya